Kim Su-jong (born 28 September 2000) is a North Korean artistic gymnast. 

She is also a World Cup champion in the floor event of the Artistic Gymnastics World Cup as she claimed gold at the 2018 FIG Artistic Gymnastics World Cup which was held in Doha.

Kim Su-jong represented North Korea at the 2018 Asian Games, which was also her first Asian Games appearance and went onto secure bronze medal in the women's individual all-around event, as well as becoming the Floor Exercise champion.

References 

2000 births
Living people
North Korean female artistic gymnasts
Gymnasts at the 2018 Asian Games
Medalists at the 2018 Asian Games
Asian Games gold medalists for North Korea
Asian Games silver medalists for North Korea
Asian Games bronze medalists for North Korea
Asian Games medalists in gymnastics
Sportspeople from Pyongyang
21st-century North Korean women